Orjaku is a village in Hiiumaa Parish, Hiiu County in northwestern Estonia.

Orjaku is one of the oldest names in the island of Hiiumaa. It was first mentioned 1254 as Oryocko, Oriwocko.

The data from 2019 says that there's 101 people living in the village.

References

 

Villages in Hiiu County